The turians  are a fictional extraterrestrial humanoid species in the Mass Effect multimedia franchise developed by BioWare and published by Electronic Arts.  Turians are the first alien species to have come into contact with humanity within series lore, which inadvertently sparked a brief but vicious period of conflict which is eventually de-escalated due to the intervention of the Citadel Council, a multispecies governing body based on the Citadel space station. The aftermath of the so-called First Contact War as well as the underlying tensions between humanity and the turians form a recurring narrative theme in the Mass Effect series, which began with the franchise's debut work, the 2007 novel Mass Effect: Revelation. Turians are conceived as an avian humanoid species with an exoskeleton, whose biology is radically different from that of humanity and several other species, and are culturally rooted in a stratocratic society. Turian characters have appeared in most Mass Effect games and media with several playing major storyline roles, such as Garrus Vakarian, Saren Arterius, Nyreen Kandros, Vetra Nyx and Tiran Kandros. In addition, the turians are playable characters in the multiplayer modes for Mass Effect 3 and Mass Effect: Andromeda.

The turians have been recognized as an important and recognizable aspect in the Mass Effect narrative, and turian characters are popular among series fans as subjects for expressions of fan labor. The relatively late introduction of female turian characters into the main series games has been met with some criticism, as well as commentary on the influence of traditional gender constructs in fiction writing and on gender representation in video games.

Concept and design
The turians originated as a vague idea for a birdlike, proud militaristic race by BioWare's writing department for Mass Effect, which the design team aimed to reflect in their features. The Bioware team was influenced by the space game Star Control II, with the Turians taking inspiration from an avian warrior race called the Yehat. Multiple character sketches which have little similarity with each other were conceived and later discarded before the team settled on artist Brian Sum's concept for the final look of the species: the horns on the back of the head resemble feathers of a bald eagle in shape, the mouth part resembles a bird's beak, and the legs are dog-like in shape. The artists originally sketched turians without any clothing in order to explore their alien anatomy, but faced limitations in designing the species' bone structure as all squadmates shared a humanoid skeleton for combat animation purposes. The team realized that the knees had to line up with the body's ankles and the waists, and that the original concept's long arms and wide waists had to be shortened in order to conform to a human-like bone structure. Their final design is broadly humanoid with two legs, two arms, and a head, and their voices have a flanging quality.

According to  Mass Effect 3 art director Derek Watts, all of the turian head models prior to the release of the Mass Effect 3: Omega downloadable content pack are almost the same with the exception of certain characters, and are male by gender. To differentiate between individual turian characters, tattoos or warpaint of different patterns and colors are employed to decorate each individual's face. For popular turian squadmate Garrus Vakarian, he is given a blue visor, and later extensive scarring on the right side of his face from Mass Effect 2 onwards, as distinct visual cues. The head design of the first game's primary antagonist Saren went through several iterations: the team experimented with structure, scarring, and decorations. His final appearance is similar to other turians but with a distinctive crest, and a lack of tattoos unlike most of his kind.

The first female member of the turian species to appear in the main series video games is introduced in Omega: the character, Nyreen Kandros, was originally an asari with no relation to the storyline's central character Aria T'Loak. Writer Ann Lemay saw the opportunity to significantly expand the character's role, change her species, and create a "diverse and engaging female character" early in the development of Omega. Lemay claimed that her request to introduce a female turian character with management was the " simplest and smoothest" process she ever went through in the video game industry. According to BioWare Montreal producer Fabrice Condominas, designing Nyreen was challenging as the team had no prior video game reference point during the pack's developmental cycle, and they wanted to ensure that the character's gender marker is unambiguous for her first impression. Vetra Nyx, a major turian character in the standalone sequel to Mass Effect 3, Mass Effect: Andromeda, is also female and serves as a companion to the player character.

Except for members of the asari race like Liara T'Soni, no other alien characters are available as romance options for the first Mass Effect. Then-project director Casey Hudson noted that the developmental team was initially unsure if they could rely on the alien characters on an emotional level in terms of storytelling, though he felt that by the time the team had finished the first game, they turn out to be some of its most emotionally engaging characters. He also noted that there was much desire for protagonist Commander Shepard and Garrus to be in a potential romantic relationship, in spite of the latter's turian physiology which has little in common with a human's, which greatly increased in popularity after Garrus becomes a romance option in Mass Effect 2.

Attributes

Biology
The turians' overall physical appearance are often described in zoological and/or mineral terms. For example, Kirk Hamilton from Kotaku called the turians "talking catfish, with a beetle-like shell and a cat-like way of speaking and acting", while Emma Kidwell from Polygon described them as "parrots with no lips". Susana Polo, writing for Polygon, drew attention to the turians' clawed digits and tough, metallic carapace as somewhat reptilian characteristics. They have head crests which resemble that of a plumed bird, avian legs with bones jutting from their calves, and a metal-laced carapace on their shoulder blades. The design of turian clothing is balanced between human and alien, and to allow space for the aforementioned physical features.

Turian physiology is directly influenced by their planetary environment: according to the series' in-game “Codex” entries, a collection of background and worldbuilding information accessible by the player, the turians' thick, carapace-like exoskeleton act as protection from Palaven's high levels of solar radiation, though it does not protect them against physical impact. The turians exhibit characteristics of sexual dimorphism: while all individuals have mandible-like facial features flanking their mouths, turian women are presented as lacking their male counterparts' sweptback cranial crests which projects a raptor-like silhouette. Instead, they possess somewhat elaborate cheek extensions, and a body shape which is considerably more graceful and slender.

Like the quarians, turian biochemistry is based on dextro-amino acids, which sets them apart from most other species, including humanity, which are based on levo-amino acids. They cannot eat human food, or ingest any substance that is based on levo-amino acids. For turian individuals who engage in sexual relationships with individuals of other species, any substance exchange may potentially make either party suffer adverse reactions, including a severe anaphylactic shock suffered by turians which is potentially fatal if untreated.

Culture
Turian culture is modeled on that of the ancient Roman civilization, and is fundamentally egalitarian with no apparent definition of specific gender roles. Turian society is centered around their military, which is supported by a well-developed infrastructure, and is considered to be an all-encompassing public works organization as opposed to merely being a state-sanctioned armed force. Most turians have a strong sense of public service, and serves the state in some capacity; military service for every citizen is seen as a mandatory part of adulthood and a cornerstone of their culture. The Turian Hierarchy, a hierarchical meritocracy which promotes individuals based on the assessments of superiors and peer, is the governing body of turian society. The Hierarchy is considered to be powerful, stable, and proactive in suppressing perceived threats, with each member of the Council of Hierarchs known as primarchs in command of an entire star cluster. The turian economy is larger than that of the human Systems Alliance but inferior to the asari in terms of size and power, with the role of business development primarily handled by a client race known as the volus.

A widespread species in the galaxy that lives according to a martial code of conduct, the turians are commonly perceived by other species to be disciplined, forthright and rule-abiding in terms of personality.  Many turians bear distinctive facial markings or tattoos unique to their home colony, considered to be both a badge of honor as well as a cultural relic from a bygone era in which the species as a whole were embroiled in civil war. The turian fleet is the largest in Citadel space, and their armed forces make up the single largest portion of the council's military force. Due to their role at the center of the Citadel's military, they often serve as law enforcement on behalf of the asari and salarians, and the starships used by other species within Council space are often based on turian designs.

The Turian Hierarchy had been a pivotal participant in major interstellar conflicts within series lore. For example, the historical Krogan Rebellions were quelled when the turians deployed a devastating biological weapon developed by the salarians known as the Krogan Genophage, which impairs the reproductive viability of the krogan on a genetic level by causing almost all newborn krogan to be stillborn. As reward for their service, the turians were invited to join the Citadel Council to fill a peacekeeper role. The First Contact War, which the turians call the "Relay 314 Incident", is another example: it broke out when turian forces attempt to stop human explorers from opening a new "mass relay", massive hyper-advanced devices of extraterrestrial origin that enables rapid transportation to other mass relays located cosmic distances away, by force in order to prevent a repeat of the Rachni Wars, a historical conflict when explorers accidentally unleashed a dangerous species of hostile insectoid creatures known as the rachni from an unexplored region of space. Although hostilities between the human Systems Alliance and the Turian Hierarchy cease following a three-month war and humanity is integrated into the galactic community soon after, mutual resentment over casualties from both sides as a result of the conflict still persist during the timeline of the original Mass Effect trilogy. This brief historical background, as presented in the game's introduction, offers insight to the ideological setup of the Mass Effect universe.

Appearances
Turian characters are featured prominently in Mass Effect media, either as leading or supporting characters. One of the main characters of Mass Effect: Revelation, the franchise's inaugural media installment, is Saren Arterius. He is a turian member of the Spectres, a special forces unit which answers directly to the Citadel Council, who resents humanity as a result of the First Contact War's events and actively works to undermine the candidacy of human Spectre hopeful David Anderson. The turian representative of the Citadel Council also appears in Revelation, with the Council being presented as the governing body and ultimate authority in Citadel space. By the novel's ending, Saren discovers a massive starship of unknown origin, which sets into motion the events of the first Mass Effect game which occurs 18 years after Revelation.

The introduction of Mass Effect begins with player character Commander Shepard on board a spacecraft known as The SSV Normandy, which is created from a joint collaboration between humans and turians with Anderson, now a Systems Alliance captain, commandeering the vessel. Shepard is poised to join the Spectres as its first human member and works under the supervision of Nihlus Kryik, a senior turian Spectre who is present on the Normandy as a Council representative. The Normandy lands on the human colony of Eden Prime during a routine incursion to investigate an attack by the geth, a synthetic race of artificial intelligences originally created by the quarians who turned on their creators. During the chaos, Shepard discovers an unearthed artifact of an extinct elder race known as the Protheans and learns about Saren, who murders Nihlus and leads the geth to search for another Prothean artifact known as the Conduit on behalf of the Reapers, a collective of sentient hyper-advanced starships that appear every fifty thousand years to wipe out all organic life in the Milky Way galaxy. Shepard is later formally inducted into the Spectres by the council and assumes command of the Normandy to hunt down Saren; among the allies Shepard may encounter include Garrus Vakarian, a turian officer working for Citadel Security Services or C-Sec. Towards the end of the first game, Saren and the Reaper Sovereign lead an army of geth to attack the Citadel, but is repulsed and defeated by its defenders.

By the events of Mass Effect 3, the Reapers had launched a galaxy-wide invasion against the various civilizations of the Milky Way. Shepard is tasked by the turian councilor with rescuing Primarch Fedorian from a military base in Menae, a moon orbiting Palaven, but discovers upon arrival that he has died along with the majority of the Hierarchy's leadership during the Reapers' initial assault. In spite of monumental losses, the turians manage to hold out and Palaven does not fall to the Reapers unlike the homeworlds of several other species. Fedorian's successor and the highest ranking turian official left alive, Adrien Victus, is secured by Shepard, and he pledges turian support to the Alliance's efforts to retake Earth once Shepard successfully convinces the krogan to reinforce Palaven's defenses. The story arc also explores the turians' role in the original deployment of the Krogan Genophage as well as an operation led by the primarch's son Tarquin Victus to disarm a bomb, planted in the aftermath of the Krogan Rebellion as a last resort weapon in the event that a resurgent krogan civilization renew their aggression within Citadel space. Mutated turians like the Marauder, "generals" among the Reapers' ground forces of synthetic-organic "husks", and the hybrid Brute spliced from a mixture of krogan and turian body parts, are introduced as new enemy types. The third game's Omega expansion pack introduced Nyreen Kandros, although minor female turian characters have appeared in other media prior to the release of Omega in November 2012.

In Mass Effect: Andromeda, a contingent of turian colonists participates in the Andromeda Initiative, a civilian project which sends settlers on board "ark ships" on a one-way trip to the Andromeda Galaxy prior to the events of Mass Effect 3. The turian smuggler Vetra Nyx joins the crew of the Andromeda Initiative Survey Ship Tempest as a companion of its commander, the human Pathfinder. Another major turian character in Andromeda is Tiran Kandros, the cousin of Nyreen who is the leader of a de facto volunteer militia responsible for station security on the Nexus, the Andromeda Initiative's seat of government, and also leads the Initiative's APEX Strike Teams which protect its interests. Tiran's backstory is explored in the limited comic series Mass Effect: Discovery, which ran from May 2017 to October 2017.

In other media
The turians are featured as a themed skin for Anthem player characters, released on November 7, 2019, in commemoration of "N7 Day", an informal celebration of the Mass Effect franchise observed annually.

Analysis
GameSpot uploaded a video in April 2012 which analyzed the plausibility of life in other parts of the universe, and if complex extraterrestrial life exists, the probability of convergent evolution which the Mass Effect series has adopted for the conception of most of its alien races. Presenter Cameron Robinson noted that most of the Mass Effect races physically resemble terrestrial animals in terms of appearance and compared the turians to crabs.

In an article published by the Bulletin of Science, Technology & Society in 2016, Eva Zekany from Central European University explored the boundaries of interspecies sex and the desire for alien romance options as depicted in the Mass Effect series, as well as their reinterpretation by Mass Effect fandom. She observed that the presentation of a human-turian romantic relationship as well as its complexities invite "interesting questions about either the potential exacerbation, or the rendering-unintelligible of sexual difference, as well as about cross-species desire and about the ontology of the natural and the artificial". Zekany drew attention to fan art which offers a "careful and detailed study" of possible turian anatomy and "the ways in which it might misfit with human anatomy". She suggested that these anatomically detailed sketches represent a type of desire that is attached to biological difference, but not sexual difference or its associated hierarchical meanings. Zekany also discussed the representation of posthumanism in Mass Effect and how it emerges through an affective connection between species which are biologically and culturally incompatible with each other by convention, giving rise to the concept of nomadic subjectivity that "transcends the artifices of gender and species definitions".

Reception

Several turian characters, most notably Garrus, have received a positive reception from players and video game journalists, and are embraced as a popular choice for fan art as well as cosplay at gaming and science fiction conventions since the franchise's inception. Saren has received some acclaim as a notable video game antagonist: he placed #29 on IGN's list of top 100 video game villains, and #92 on GamesRadar's list of 100 best villains in video games published in 2013. PC Gamer staff ranked Vetra as the second best squadmate of Andromeda, with praise for her nuanced and relatable characterization.

The lack of female turian characters for the majority of the first three main series games attracted criticism.
 Zekany noted from her research that Watts’ remarks from an interview with Game Informer prompted backlash among players who "used the incident as an opportunity to criticize the industry’s general unwillingness to invent in diverse nonmale character designs", while others chose to ignore his comments as part of their personal interpretation of the Mass Effect universe. Zekany herself was perplexed by the exclusion of female turian characters throughout most of the original trilogy, as turian society "does not uphold any rigid gender hierarchies". Polo, writing for The Mary Sue, called out Watt's comments as "lazy" and found it incredulous that female turians are only introduced after female krogan when contrasting the different circumstances between their respective societies. Mumu Lin from the Daily Californian said BioWare's decision, which she opined is based on "societally ordained concepts" of gender, almost gave the impression that the turians are a mono-gendered species in the same manner as the asari. Lin argued that this is a result of the writers' anthropocentric view when coming up with a “diverse” world, and that unlike the krogan, there is no excuse for female members of a thriving species like the turians to be excluded from being encountered by the player character in an entire galaxy across three games.

The introduction of Nyreen in the Omega DLC has received varied commentary. Some praised her characterization and welcomed the decision as female representation was important for the game; others were disappointed that her visual design consisted of features that mostly relied on conventional depictions of femininity as interpreted through the lens of a human understanding of gender, with some even preferring a lack of divergent gender markers in turian characters. Lin was of the view that the inclusion of a major female turian character was an attempt by BioWare to address criticism of their limited view of possibilities in alien races which are influenced by heteronormative or traditional gender constructs.

Cultural references
American electronic musician Baths wrote and composed a song called "Turian Courtship", which is included in a B-Side compilation released in 2011.

An internet meme called "Marauder Shields" originated from negative player reception towards a portion of the controversial ending sequence of Mass Effect 3. It sarcastically references the fact that the final enemy unit the player fights in the game is a standard Marauder protected by defense shields, who is nevertheless easily dispatched by the player as Shepard. The meme's notoriety inspired a parody webcomic about the character.

An advanced persistent threat (APT) group which targets various states' Ministries of Foreign Affairs as well as telecommunication companies in Africa and the Middle East utilizes backdoor method as part of its modus operandi; a custom backdoor which emerged in the late 2010s 
is dubbed "Turian" and noted for its similarities to "Quarian", another backdoor deployed against Syrian and American diplomatic targets in the early 2010s.

References

External links

Extraterrestrial characters in video games
Fictional warrior races
Mass Effect characters
Video game characters introduced in 2007
Video game species and races
Avian humanoids